Kynsivesi–Leivonvesi is a medium-sized lake of Central Finland, in the municipalities of Laukaa, Hankasalmi and Konnevesi. It belongs to the Kymijoki main catchment area. The outflow to the lake Kuusvesi is Simunankoski rapids.

References

See also
List of lakes in Finland

Lakes of Laukaa
Lakes of Konnevesi
Lakes of Hankasalmi